Mahdjouba (Arabic: محجوبة) or Mhadjeb is a crepe-like semolina based flatbread originating from Algeria.

Mhadjeb is a traditional Algerian dish, it is a fine crepe-like semolina based flatbread typically stuffed with a mixture of onion, garlic, tomato, peppers and spices. It is very popular in all the regions of Algeria, including the southern regions such as Ouargla, Ghardaia, and Tamanrasset. It is one of the essential dishes offered in Algerian street foods. The mahdjouba, which means "covered" or "veiled" in Algerian Darja, originates from southern Algeria Biskra, Touggourt. It is the vegetable filled variation of M'semen, a traditional North African flatbread.

See also
 Algerian cuisine

References

Algerian cuisine
African cuisine
Mediterranean cuisine
Arab cuisine
Berber cuisine